Lieutenant-General Sir Jacob Louis van Deventer KCB CMG DTD (18 July 1874 – 17 August 1922) was a South African military commander.

Van Deventer was born in Ficksburg in the Orange Free State. He began his military career in the Transvaal republican forces in Pretoria on 21 February 1896, and fought in the Anglo-Boer War (1899-1902). He was physically a very big man standing almost 2 m tall. A serious wound at the end of the Anglo Boer War affected his ability to speak. Van Deventer was skilled at guerrilla tactics.

He returned to military service in World War I, and commanded a Union Defence Forces formation in the South West Africa Campaign (1914-1915). In the German East Africa Campaign (1916-1918), he commanded a South African Overseas Expeditionary Force mounted brigade, then a division, and finally (1917-1918) all the British imperial forces in the region (though, allegedly, he could hardly speak English). He was knighted twice for his services.

After the war, he was a part-time inspecting officer. He was made a Grand Officer of the Portuguese Military Order of Aviz in 1921. In 1922, he commanded a mounted brigade in operations to crush the Rand Revolt on the Witwatersrand.  He married Maria Cornelia Snyman, born 5 May 1890. He died later in Pretoria in 1922.

References

 Van Deventer W.D Dr (1993)  Van Deventer stamboom en Agtergrond 
 Nothling, C.J. (1994).  Suid-Afrika in die Eerste Wereldoorlog.

1874 births
1922 deaths
People from Ficksburg
Afrikaner people
South African military personnel
South African military personnel of World War I
Boer military personnel of the Second Boer War
South African Companions of the Order of St Michael and St George
Knights Commander of the Order of the Bath
South African knights
South African generals
Orange Free State people